Uganda Heart Institute (UHI), is a specialized, public, tertiary care medical facility owned by the Uganda Ministry of Health. It is a component of Mulago National Referral Hospital, the largest hospital in Uganda, which serves as the teaching hospital of Makerere University College of Health Sciences.

Location
The Institute is located on Mulago Hill in the northern part of the city of Kampala. It sits within the Mulago Hospital Complex, the teaching hospital of the Makerere University College of Health Sciences. The coordinates of the Institute are 0°20'17.0"N, 32°34'31.0"E (Latitude:0.338056; Longitude:32.575278).

Overview
Uganda Heart Institute (UHI) was established as an autonomous body by an Act of Parliament (The Uganda Heart Institute ACT, 2016). The Institute is now a super specialized leading provider of cardiovascular services and the only National Referral Facility for heart diseases in Uganda.

Currently, UHI, using a modest investment and an enabling legal framework has trained cardiac super specialists and installed a state of the Art Cardiac catheterization laboratory and operating theatre which have enabled them to conduct ground breaking heart surgeries and interventions of World-Class.

Uganda Heart Institute handles over 20,000 patients annually. The Institute started carrying out Open Heart Surgery in 2007 and to-date; over 7000 heart operations have been performed. This in effect means the Uganda Heart Institute can comprehensively handle over 95% of the adult cases and 85% of the cases among children in Uganda. This is in line with the NDP2 strategy of reducing referrals abroad to less than 5%.

In order to improve access to heart care, UHI is developing capacity to operationalize Regional centers in collaboration with Ministry of Health and Regional Referral Hospitals. The Institute is partnering with various Stakeholders including Civil society, to promote health through advocating for a healthy lifestyle.

The preventive programs are being addressed through a multi- sectoral approach with the Ministry of Health and other local and international partners.

What Uganda Heart Institute needs now is more working space and lager operational budgets to enable it fulfill its mandate.

History
In 1988, the Uganda Heart Foundation, in collaboration with the Uganda Ministry of Health, Makerere University and Mulago National Referral Hospital, started the Uganda Heart Institute, using space provided on Ward 1C, in the New Mulago Hospital Complex. This resurrected plans to establish a specialized cardiac unit at Mulago, began in 1958, but were killed in 1972, with the expulsion of the Ugandan Asians by dictator Idi Amin. Since 1988, the Institute has received valuable contribution from national and international donors including the Rotary Club. Media reports indicate that of the 1.5 million children born every year in Uganda, about 15,000 have heart defects at birth (congenital heart abnormalities). Of those, about 8,000 children require corrective surgeries. Uganda's only heart institute has the capacity to perform only 1,000 heart operations annually. That leaves a backlog of 7,000 youngsters every year.

Expansion plans
Beginning in August 2015, the Government of Uganda plans to break ground for a new 200 bed hospital to be named Uganda Institute of Cardiothoracic Diseases, to replace the current Uganda Heart Institute. The new hospital will have three operating theatres, cardiac catheterization laboratories, an Intensive Care Unit, and research facilities. The construction will be funded by a US$64.9 million (UGX:169 billion) loan from the Islamic Development Bank. It is anticipated that the Institute will seek financial autonomy to raise funds, hire staff, pay salaries, and procure supplies, independent of Mulago Hospital, similar to the autonomy enjoyed by the Uganda Cancer Institute.

The New Vision newspaper, reported in November 2016, that Uganda Heart Institute had acquired land measuring  along Owen Road in the Mulago neighborhood, where it was going to build its new headquarters. The new complex will consist of three towers: (a) the first tower will house the outpatient clinics and hospital beds, including an intensive care unit (b) the second tower will include research laboratories and conference rooms and (c) the third tower will house critical staff, such as research fellows, residents and biomedical engineers. Total cost for the entire project is budgeted at US$65 million, of which US$51 million is for construction and the US$14 million balance is for equipment.

In April 2022, Dr John Omagino, the Executive director of UHI disclosed that the institute had acquired  of land in the Naguru–Nakawa Government Complex. The institute plans to build a 250-bed hospital here, expandable to 1,000 beds over time. The new hospital is expected to save the government of Uganda an estimated US$73 million that is spent on treating high ranking government officials overseas annually.

In July 2022, the UHI disclosed that a consortium comprising the Saudi Fund for Development, the OPEC Fund for International Development and the Arab Bank for Economic Development in Africa had agreed to lend US$75 million (UGX 285 billion) "for establishing a state-of-the-art heart surgery and treatment centre", at Naguru, in Kampala. This new hospital will be capable of performing 5,000 heart surgeries annually, up form the current 1,000 performed in the limited space at Mulago.

New developments
On Monday 22 January 2018, an all-Ugandan team of 14 healthcare specialists performed the first coronary artery bypass surgery operation by an all Ugandan team, in the history of the heart institute. The successful 10-hour operation was billed at USh18 million (approx. US$5,000), compared to USh300 million (approx. US$83,000), if it were done in a private hospital in South Africa, a common destination for Ugandan patients, with means.

In April 2018, a cohort of 11 patients with abnormal heart rhythms, underwent a procedure called catheter ablation using the radiofrequency ablation method. All eleven of the patients benefited and recovered well. This was the first time this type of procedure was performed in Uganda.

Board of directors
, the following individuals constituted the board of directors of the Institute:

List of medical directors of UHI
The following cardiologists and cardiothoracic surgeons have served as the director of the Uganda Heart Institute since its foundation in 1988:
 Francis Omaswa, cardiovascular surgeon, 1988 - 1998
 Roy Mugerwa, cardiologist, 1998 - 2008
 John Omagino, cardiothoracic surgeon, since 2008

See also
 Makerere University School of Medicine
 Hospitals in Uganda
 Mulago Women's Referral Hospital
 Uganda Cancer Institute
 List of medical schools in Uganda
 Makerere University College of Health Sciences

References

External links
 Mulago Hospital Web Site

Hospitals in Kampala
Makerere University
Kawempe Division
Heart disease organizations
1988 establishments in Uganda